Centre Academy East Anglia, formerly known as The Old Rectory School is a private special school in Brettenham, Suffolk, England, founded in 1981. The school offers an educational opportunity for children with dyslexia, developmental coordination disorder, AD/HD and related SpLD (specific learning difficulties). It is well known for its specialist, whole school approach and attempts to return pupils to mainstream education. Boarding places were also available, however as of September 5, 2022, these places are no longer available
The school's curriculum is designed for children with specific learning difficulties aged 8–19. Pupils have access to a broad and balanced National Curriculum. Classes are small and set by ability, not year group. Classers are taught in groups of no more than 14.

Special schools in Suffolk
Private schools in Suffolk
Educational institutions established in 1981
Brettenham, Suffolk
1981 establishments in England